Bruna Vilamala Costa (born 4 June 2002) is a Spanish professional footballer who plays as a striker for Liga F club FC Barcelona.

Club career
Born in the town of Borgonyà in the municipality of San Vicente de Torelló, Vilamala joined the grassroots FC Barcelona when she was only eleven years old.

In October 2018, Vilamala tore her ACL in a match against AEM Lleida.

She debuted with the Barça first team on 1 February 2020 against Sevilla at only 17 years of age, with Vilamala being the fourth youngest player to wear the shirt of the culés. During the 2020–21 season, she was a regular on the payrolls of the Barça first team despite the fact that she still had a filial role. On 18 October 2020, she scored her first goal in the Primera División in the 6-0 win against Sporting de Huelva. On 10 May 2021, she scored against Granadilla, which would be decisive in the 1-0 victory, with which they won the Liga Iberdrola title. In that season, Barcelona would end the best campaign in its history by winning the Liga, Copa de la Reina and Champions League titles. For her part, Vilamala would close the season with 12 goals converted in the Liga in just 15 games, being the sixth highest scorer of the culé campaign and the second with the best scoring average.

On 25 October 2021, Vilamala suffered the second ACL tear of her career during a friendly with Spain's under-23 national football team. She reappeared on 20 November 2022 in a Liga F match against Deportivo Alavés.

Club summary

International career
In 2018, Vilamala was called up to the Spanish U-17 team to take part in the women's U-17 European Championship, which was held in Lithuania.

Honours

Club
Barcelona
 Primera División: 2020-21, 2021–22
 Copa de la Reina: 2020-21, 2021-22
 UEFA Women's Champions League: 2020–21
 Supercopa de España Femenina: 2021–22

International
 Spain
 UEFA Women's Under-17 Championship: Winner 2018

References

External links
 Bruna Vilamala at FC Barcelona
 Bruna Vilamala at BDFutbol
 
 
 

2002 births
Living people
People from Osona
Sportspeople from the Province of Barcelona
Footballers from Catalonia
Spanish women's footballers
Primera División (women) players
FC Barcelona Femení players
Women's association football forwards
FC Barcelona Femení B players
Segunda Federación (women) players
Sportswomen from Catalonia